The 2011 Open Seguros Bolívar was a professional tennis tournament played on clay courts. It was the seventh edition of the tournament which was part of the 2011 ATP Challenger Tour and the fifth edition for the 2011 ITF Women's Circuit. It took place in Bogotá, Colombia between 11 and 17 July 2011.

ATP singles main draw entrants

Seeds

 1 Rankings are as of July 4, 2011.

Other entrants
The following players received wildcards into the singles main draw:
  Nicolás Barrientos
  Feliciano López
  Nicolás Massú
  Eduardo Struvay

The following players received entry from the qualifying draw:
  Guillermo Durán
  Juan Sebastián Gómez
  Sebastián López
  Ryusei Makiguchi

WTA entrants

Seeds

 1 Rankings are as of July 4, 2011.

Other entrants
The following players received wildcards into the singles main draw:
  Veronia Corning
  Marcela Gómez
  Libby Muma
  Andrea Prisco

The following players received entry from the qualifying draw:
  Robyn Beddow
  Patricia Cortes
  Mikele Irazusta
  Paula Catalina Robles Garcia
  Alexandra Riley
  Laura Sofia Sánchez Pérez
  Camila Tobar
  Diana Woodcock

The following players received entry by a lucky loser spot:
  Milagros Cubelli

Champions

Men's singles

 Feliciano López def.  Carlos Salamanca, 6–4, 6–3

Women's singles

 Mariana Duque def.  María Fernanda Álvarez Terán, 7–6(8–6), 4–6, 6–3

Men's doubles

 Treat Conrad Huey /  Izak van der Merwe def.  Juan Sebastián Cabal /  Robert Farah, 7–6(7–3), 6–7(5–7), [7–2], defaulted

Women's doubles

 Andrea Gámiz /  Adriana Pérez def.  Julia Cohen /  Andrea Koch Benvenuto, 6–3, 6–4

References
Official Website

External links
Men's ITF Search 
Women's ITF Search 
ATP official site

Open Seguros Bolivar
Open Seguros Bolivar
Seguros Bolívar Open Bogotá
2011 in Colombian tennis